Yasmeen Ismail (28 March 1950, in Rawalpindi – 18 January 2002, in Karachi) was a Pakistani television actress and theater director. She is known for her role in the PTV drama Tanhaiyaan (1985).

Early life
She was born in Rawalpindi on March 28, 1950. Yasmeen Ismail studied in many schools and convents as her father, an army colonel, got posted from one place to another. She graduated from Home Economics College.

Career
She moved to Karachi shortly after her father's death in 1971. She got married in 1974. Her association with PTV began in the late 1960s. Theatre lured her away as she became the head of the Karachi chapter of the Gripp's Theatre in 1980. She directed about 24 plays. Their plays, mostly written/adapted by playwright Imran Aslam, were appreciated by people. A little before Ramazan, she directed her last play, titled Osama Ho To Samaney Aiy, which was written by Mr Aslam. Ismail became director of Gripp's Theatre in Karachi in 1980.

Personal life
At the time of her death, her son, Amal Ismail, was a 22-year-old entrepreneur and her daughter, Sila Ismail, was an 18-year-old student of the Indus Valley School of Art and Architecture. Her husband, Tariq Ismail, was a Managing Director of one of Pakistan’s largest distribution companies.

Illness and death
After battling ovarian cancer for 5 years, Ismail died from cancer on 18 January 2002 in Karachi. She was laid to rest after Asr prayers on Friday in the Army Graveyard in Defence Housing Authority in Karachi.

Filmography

Television series
 Sheshe Aadmi
 Nishan-e-Haider Rashid Minhas Shaheed
 Andhera Ujala
 Ana
 Do Sooraj
 Tanhaiyaan (1985) (PTV)
 Des Pardes
 Tapish
 Ghar Daftar Aur Hum
 Ajaib Khana
 Bacchon Ka Theatre
 Labaik Labaik
 Family 93
 Panchwan Mausam
 Kabhi Kabhi Pyar Mein

Telefilm
 Marhoom Brigadier Ki Betiyan
 Zeher

Film
 Deewane Tere Pyar Ke

Theatre Director
 Stokkerlock and Millilipi
 Mugnog Kids
 Choti Moti Tota Aur S. M. Hamid
 Pak Zar Zameen
 Hawa Ko Dawa Do
 Rail Pail Ka Khail
 Haspatal Ka Haal Achha Hai
 Kabab May Haddi
 Osama Ho To Samaney Aiy (last play before death)

References

External links
 

Pakistani television actresses
1950 births
Pakistani film actresses
2002 deaths
People from Rawalpindi
Actresses from Karachi
20th-century Pakistani actresses
Actresses from Rawalpindi
Pakistani theatre directors
Women theatre directors
21st-century Pakistani actresses